The 6th BET Awards took place at the Shrine Auditorium in Los Angeles, California on June 27, 2006. The awards recognized Americans in music, acting, sports, and other fields of entertainment over the past year. Comedian Damon Wayans hosted the event for the first time.

Nominees and winners

References

External links
 BET Awards website

BET Awards